Rishad Zahir is an Afghan singer and musician from the United States. He is the son of the Afghan singer Ahmad Zahir.

Early life
Rishad Zahir was born in Seattle, Washington during his parents' visit to the United States. After spending a year in Seattle, they all returned to Afghanistan. Soon after, Rishad, accompanied by his mother left for the United States permanently. He and his family are from the Pashtun ethnic group and are originally from  Laghman.

Career
He showed interest in music at the age of 11. He was inspired by his father's music and singing. While perfecting his understanding of his mother tongue, he also furthered his studies in the art of music, by seeking the guidance of elite musicians, and studying books and classical music. Rishad in 1987, at the age of 17, released his first full album Guli Intezar. He then released a second album in 1990, Tu Guli Nazi Hama. His third album Negahi Gahi, released in 1993. He had eight concerts from 1990 in both the U.S. and Europe. With his interest in music fully developed, he decided to pursue his interest in Dari literature. He impelled in his pursuit of ascertaining a greater understanding of Persian literature, by the fact that he had been deprived of the opportunity in Afghanistan. Rishad currently resides in California.

Discography
His CD titled Ishq-e-Mann was released in November 1999.

Album: Various
 01 – Imroz 
 02 – Dilbara
 03 – Deedar 
 04 – Chi Khab Deedam-o
 04 – Tu Kujayee

Album: Live Volume 1
 01 – Ze Jaan Man
 02 – Soze Qalbam
 03 – Maast o Ghazal Khan
 04 – Jaan Jan
 05 – Har Chand o Mara
 06 – Door Az Tu
 07 – Bego Ke Gul
 08 – Baaz Ai
 09 – Aqlam Rabood
 10 – Anke Ze Dar Merasad

Album: Live Volume 2
 01 – San Nest 
 02 – Ze Ha Mo 
 03 – Ya Mawla 
 04 – Muhammad 
 05 – Imshaab 
 06 – Ba Kudam Dar 
 07 – Akhreen Sham 
 08 – Agar Penhan

Album: Live Volume 3
 01 – Tura Man Dost Medaram
 02 – Rshani Chashmam
 03 – Khyal   
 04 – Khuda Konad    
 05 – Faqat Soze
 06 – Dil Shuda Ghafel
 07 – Ai Deedai Ranj

References

External links
 Rishad Zahir on Facebook
 Rishad Zahir concert tours
 Kabulvideos.com
 Afghan3000.com

21st-century Afghan male singers
Afghan Tajik people
Living people
Year of birth missing (living people)